Ryan Pierce (born July 9, 1983 in Albany, New York) is an American soccer player.

Career

College and Amateur
Pierce played two years of college soccer at Herkimer County Community College, where he was a NJCAA 1st Team All American, before transferring to Binghamton University as a junior in 2004.

During his college years Pierce also played in the Premier Development League with both his hometown Albany Admirals and the Cape Cod Crusaders.

Professional
Pierce turned professional with Harrisburg City Islanders in the USL Second Division in 2007, and made his professional debut on April 21, 2007 in Harrisburg's first game of the season, a 1–1 tie with the Wilmington Hammerheads.

After helping the Islanders win the 2007 USL-2 championship, he transferred to Crystal Palace Baltimore for the 2009 season.

Pierce also has professional indoor soccer experience, having helped the Baltimore Blast win the 2008/2009 NISL Championship.

Pierce signed with the Pittsburgh Riverhounds for the 2010 USL-2 season, and made his debut April 24, 2010 as a substitute against the Charleston Battery.

References

External links
 Crystal Palace Baltimore bio
 Baltimore Blast bio

American soccer players
Living people
1983 births
USL League Two players
USL Second Division players
Albany BWP Highlanders players
Baltimore Blast (2008–2014 MISL) players
Cape Cod Crusaders players
Crystal Palace Baltimore players
Penn FC players
Pittsburgh Riverhounds SC players
Syracuse Silver Knights players
Association football defenders
Soccer players from New York (state)
Sportspeople from Albany, New York
Binghamton Bearcats men's soccer players
Major Indoor Soccer League (2008–2014) players